Vaiaau, also known as Vaia'au is an associated commune on the island of Raiatea, in French Polynesia. It is part of the commune Tumaraa. According to the 2017 census, it had a population of 837.

References

Raiatea
Populated places in the Society Islands